The 2019 Kansas Jayhawks football team, representing the University of Kansas for the 130th season, was led by first-year head coach Les Miles. Members of the Big 12 Conference during the 2019 NCAA Division I FBS football season, the Jayhawks played their home games at David Booth Kansas Memorial Stadium. Their season was chronicled by ESPN+ in the docuseries Miles to Go: Les Miles and Kansas Football.

The Jayhawks attempted to end two major losing streaks, but instead extended the streaks. They extended their consecutive losses on the road to Big 12 teams to 45 games. They also extended their streak of consecutive games lost to teams ranked in the AP poll to 38. With a 48–24 win over Boston College, KU ended a 48-game road losing streak against power five conference teams. With the Jayhawks seventh loss of the season to Oklahoma State, they became ineligible for a bowl game for the eleventh consecutive season, the last time they were eligible was the 2008 season. They finished the season 3–9, 1–8 in Big 12 play to finish in last place.

On July 8, 2019, Kansas announced that 1st team All-Big 12 running back Pooka Williams Jr. will be suspended for the first game of the season against Indiana State as discipline for his arrest for domestic battery December 2018.

On October 6, 2019, Miles fired offensive coordinator Les Koenning. Senior offensive analyst Brent Dearmon was promoted to replace him. Additionally, Dearmon was named quarterbacks coach.

Preseason

Big 12 media poll
The 2019 Big 12 media days were held July 15–16, 2019 in Frisco, Texas. In the Big 12 preseason media poll, Kansas was predicted to finish in last in the standings.

Schedule

Source:

Game summaries
All-time records for each opponent do not include the results for 2019 and are only for prior to the 2019 season.

Indiana State

Coastal Carolina

at Boston College

The Kansas Jayhawks came into the game as a three touchdown underdog, but performances by quarterback Carter Stanley (238 yards passing) and running back Pooka Williams (121 yards rushing) combined with other efforts to give the Jayhawks their first road win against a "power 5" team in almost 11 years.

Boston College scored first and had the lead 10-0 until the Jayhawks scored on six straight possessions.  Kansas took the lead 28–24 at the half thanks to an 82-yard run with 40 seconds remaining before the break to set up a 3-yard score just two plays later.  Kansas continued to score in the second half but Boston College could not match the effort.  The final score was Kansas 48, Boston College 24.

West Virginia

Kansas started conference play having just rolled off a win against Boston College, but West Virginia was expected to take advantage of observing the Jayhawks offensive performance the prior week.

When the game rolled around, the Jayhawk offense made two specific mistakes that impacted the game:  A lost fumble and a fourth quarter interception.  On the positive side, KU averaged 7.4 yards per play.  It also appeared that KU kicker Liam Jones faked an injury after a field goal to make way for Jacob Borcila to "replace" him at the next kickoff to execute an onside kick—which they recovered but then lost due to a penalty.  West Virginia won the game 29–24.

at TCU

Texas Christian scored 21 points in the first quarter against Kansas and led 38–0 at halftime, with Max Duggan making his second consecutive start at quarterback.  However, Alex Delton still was on record as a team captain and he saw play time in the second half.  Headed into the fourth quarter with no score, Kansas had only managed 55 yards on 34 plays.  Quarterback Carter Stanley finished 12–29 in passing with 84 yards, but the Jayhawks managed to score in the fourth quarter to avoid being shut out.  The game ended with TCU scoring 51 to the Jayhawks 14.

Oklahoma

Oklahoma traveled to Lawrence for what resulted in an "easy victory" for the Sooners, but Kansas "outplayed" the sooners for the bulk of the first quarter.  Kansas even scored first with a touchdown after forcing Oklahoma to punt.  Kansas then gained 98 yards for their touchdown and led 7–0 in the first quarter.  Oklahoma then took control and led 21–7 at halftime.

Oklahoma managed 29 first downs and converted 6 of 9 times on third down, with 545 total yards of offense.  Oklahoma also threw an interception for the only turnover of the game.  Kansas only managed 18 first downs with 6–14 on third down. They also attempted 2 fourth-down conversions but both were unsuccessful, with a total of 360 yards of offense.  Kansas did manage a little more clock time of offense with 30:29 time of possession compared to Oklahoma's 29:31.  The final score was Oklahoma 45, Kansas 20.

Oklahoma completed their 22nd straight true road win, which was the second longest streak since at least World War II in major college football when Coach Bud Wilkinson led the sooners to 25 wins from 1953 to 1958.

at Texas

The underdog Kansas Jayhawks stayed with the #15 Texas Longhorns for four quarters of play.  In the last minutes, Carter Stanley was successful with a 22-yard scoring pass to Stephon Robinson.  The following 2-point conversion throw to Daylon Charlot put the Jayhawks ahead by one point.  With 1:11 left to play when Texas took over and put together an offensive drive that ended with a game-winning field goal for the Longhorns.

Even with the loss, several of the Kansas players gave great performances:  Pooka Williams rushed for 190 yards and two touchdowns; quarterback Carter Stanley threw 310 yards and four touchdowns for the Jayhawks. For the Longhorns, Sam Ehlinger rushed for 91 yards and managed 399 yards passing with four touchdowns.  When everything was complete, Texas won by a score of 50–48.

Texas Tech

Texas Tech controlled the game early, racing to a 17–0 lead in the second quarter before Kansas quarterback Carter Stanley scored 2 touchdowns, 1 rushing and 1 passing, in the final 5 minutes of the half to go into halftime down 17–14.  Texas Tech would similarly dominate the early part of the second half, scoring 10 unanswered points, before being answered with two long touchdown passes by Stanley to tie the game at 27.  After each team scored another touchdown, Kansas would force a Texas Tech punt and then drove to the Texas Tech 22 with 13 seconds left.  With the score tied 34 each, Texas Tech blocked a field goal attempt—but when Douglas Coleman of Texas Tech fumbled during an attempt to return the field goal it gave the Jayhawks a second chance with better field position.  Texas Tech successfully blocked the first 40-yard field goal attempt and Coleman caught the ball, who then tried to lateral the ball to another teammate.  However, the lateral went in the direction where no Red Raider player was and Kansas recovered the ball.  Kicker Liam Jones then got another chance to win the game and was successful.  The final score was Texas Tech 34, Kansas 37.

The Kansas offense scored on four of its last five possessions to overcome a 17-point deficit.  The win was the first Big 12 Conference victory for Les Miles while as the coach at Kansas, and the first Homecoming victory for Kansas since October 10, 2009. Jones won Big 12 Special Teams player of the week honors thanks to his game-winning kick, while Stanley's 415 yard, 4 touchdown performance made him the Big 12 Offensive player of the week.

Texas Tech's coach Matt Wells praised Jayhawk coach Les Miles after the game:  "I think Coach Miles brings credibility to that program. I mean, the job that he obviously did at Oklahoma State and did at LSU speaks for itself. He's had success everywhere he's been. And those kids played hard on Saturday. They really did. They went out and, man, they did. They emptied the tank and had every right to win and deserved to win."

Kansas State

Both Kansas and Kansas State came in to the 2019 Sunflower Showdown coming off wins:  Kansas State defeating Oklahoma and Kansas defeating Texas Tech.  Both teams come in after solid growth and improvement through the season and enter the game excited for their rivalry.

Kansas State scored a touchdown on its first possession and held the lead for the remainder of the game.  Kansas State's offensive line was praised for their control of the line of scrimmage to help the Wildcats rush for 342 yards and five touchdowns.  On Defense, Kansas State held their rival Jayhawks to just 10 points.  Defensivley, Kansas State also pulled two interceptions and sacked Kansas quarterback Carter Stanley four times.  Stanley's passing production was 13-for-23 with 123 yards, a far cry from the over 400 yards against Texas Tech and over 300 yards he put up against the Texas Longhorns in recent play.

The Kansas Jayhawks entered the game with high hopes and expectations--"convinced" that they would win largely based on performance in their previous two games. However, the Jayhawks only managed a field goal in the first quarter and did not score again until they managed a touchdown in the fourth quarter.  That touchdown was the final score of the game:  Kansas State 38; Kansas 10.

at Oklahoma State

at Iowa State

Baylor

Coaching staff

All-Big 12 selections
 Hakeem Adeniji, T, 1st team
 Hasan Defense, CB, Honorable mention
 Azur Kamara, LB, Honorable mention
 Mike Lee, S, Honorable mention
 Ben Miles, FB, Honorable mention 
 Andrew Parchment, WR, Honorable mention
 Kyle Thompson, P, Honorable mention
 Pooka Williams Jr., RB, 1st team

References

Kansas
Kansas Jayhawks football seasons
Kansas Jayhawks football